Darren Clarke (born 17 April 1970) is an English former professional snooker player.

Career
Born in 1970, Clarke turned professional in 1991. He first saw significant progress at the 1993 European Open, where he defeated Suriya Suwannasingh, Bob Harris, Sean Storey, John Campbell and Dene O'Kane, before losing 4–5 to Darren Morgan in the last 32.

Clarke repeated this feat in the next staging of the event, later in 1993, winning six matches to set up a meeting with Ken Doherty. Doherty began with a break of 109 and Clarke took the third frame 75–28, but the former prevailed 5–1.

Four years of poor form ensued before Clarke reached the last 32 at another ranking event. During the 1996/1997 season, he beat Leo Fernandez, Jeff Cundy, Jimmy Michie, Paul Hunter and whitewashed Dennis Taylor 5–0 at the 1997 European Open, holding Alan McManus to 2–2 before McManus defeated him 5–2.

Clarke next progressed to the last 32 at the 1999 Welsh Open, losing 2–5 to Stephen Hendry, and the Scottish Open of that year, where he beat Mike Dunn, David Gray and Steve Davis before losing 1–5 to Chris Small. In that season's British Open, he again faced Davis; this time, Davis recovered from a 0–2 deficit to win 5–2.

The second British Open of 1999 – in the 1999/2000 season – saw Clarke reach the last 32 once more; on this occasion, he led Joe Swail 4–2 but lost 4–5.

In decline and ranked 103rd, Clarke dropped off the tour at the end of the 2000/2001 season. His performances in qualifying events the following season were sufficient to earn him a new tour card, but 2002/2003 bore no success. He faced Icelander Kristján Helgason on four occasions, Helgason winning each – the last, a 10–1 victory in the 2003 World Championship, was Clarke's final match as a professional. As the world number 109, he lost his place on the tour at the age of 33.

Clarke attempted to regain his professional status during the 2003/2004 and 2004/2005 seasons, but was unsuccessful.

References

English snooker players
Living people
1970 births
Sportspeople from Liverpool